Xinjiangwancheng, is a Shanghai Metro station located on Line 10 in Yangpu District, Shanghai. Located at the intersection of Songhu Road and Yinhang Road, it is named after the nearby residential community of New Jiangwan City, which was built on the former Jiangwan Airport lands. It opened with the rest of the first phase of Line 10 on April 10, 2010. It served as the northern terminus of the line until 26 December 2020, when phase two of Line 10 opened, extending the line further north to  station.

Station layout 
The station has three tracks, with four platforms on two islands. The central track is used for short-turn trains which terminate at Xinjiangwancheng station or westbound trains towards Hangzhong Road, while the tracks on either side of the station are used for through trains. Prior to the opening of phase 2 of Line 10, all trains used the central track and the southbound platform.

References 

Railway stations in Shanghai
Shanghai Metro stations in Yangpu District
Railway stations in China opened in 2010
Line 10, Shanghai Metro